Jesse Francis Stallings (April 4, 1856 – March 18, 1928) was a U.S. Representative from Alabama.

Born near Manningham, Alabama, to Reuben Stallings and Lucinda Ferguson. Stallings completed preparatory studies and was graduated from the University of Alabama at Tuscaloosa in 1877.
He studied law at that university. Through his father he was descended from Jacob Astley, 1st Baron Astley of Reading and Edward Ford.

He was admitted to the bar in April 1880 and commenced practice in Greenville, Alabama.

Stallings was elected by the legislature of Alabama as solicitor for the second judicial circuit in November 1886 and served until his resignation in September 1892.
He served as delegate to the Democratic National Convention in 1888.

Stallings was elected as a Democrat to the Fifty-third and to the three succeeding Congresses (March 4, 1893 – March 3, 1901).
He was not a candidate for renomination in 1900 and resumed the practice of his profession in Birmingham, Alabama.
Also served as president of the Lincoln Reserve Life Insurance Co. 1912 to 1928.

Personal life
He married Ella McAllister in 1883, who later died in 1885.  He then married Belle McAllister in 1887. In 1909, Stallings married Marie Hudmon.

Stallings died in Birmingham. He was interred in Elmwood Cemetery.

References

External links

 The Political Career of Jesse Francis Stallings, 1937 - Google books
 Jesse Francis Stallings: Democratic Adherent of Populism and Precursor of Progressivism, 1968 - Google books

1856 births
1928 deaths
Democratic Party members of the United States House of Representatives from Alabama
19th-century American politicians